The Norwood Vipers were a Senior "AAA" ice hockey team from Norwood, Ontario, Canada.  They played in the Ontario Hockey Association's Allan Cup Hockey League.

History
In 2004, the Norwood Vipers joined the Eastern Ontario Senior Hockey League.  They won the league championship in their first season after downing the Whitby Dunlops in six-games.

In 2008, the Eastern Ontario Senior Hockey League folded and the Vipers joined Major League Hockey which changed its name to Allan Cup Hockey for the 2011-12 season.

The Vipers sat out the 2012-13 season.

The 2013-14 season started under a new owner, Bob McCleery.

Season-by-season results

External links
Vipers Homepage

Eastern Ontario Senior Hockey League teams